Rolando Hammer Casadio (13 June 1921 – 16 January 1987) was a Chilean basketball player. He competed in the men's tournament at the 1948 Summer Olympics.

References

External links
 

1921 births
1987 deaths
Chilean men's basketball players
Olympic basketball players of Chile
Basketball players at the 1948 Summer Olympics
Place of birth missing
20th-century Chilean people